Trimeresurus hageni, commonly known as the Hagen's pit viper (or Hagen's green pit viper), is a species of pit viper, a venomous snake, in the subfamily Crotalinae of the family Viperidae.  The species is endemic to Southeast Asia. There are no subspecies that are recognized as being valid.

Etymology
The specific name, hageni, is in honor of German naturalist Dr. Bernhard Hagen, who collected mammals, birds, reptiles, and insects in the eastern part of Sumatra.

Description

 
Scalation of T. hageni includes 21 rows of dorsal scales at midbody, 176–198 ventral scales, 63–89 subcaudal scales, and 9–12 supralabial scales.

Geographic range
Trimeresurus hageni is found in Peninsular Thailand, Peninsular Malaysia, East Malaysia (Borneo), and Indonesia (Sumatra and the nearby islands of Bangka, Simalur, Nias, Batu, and the Mentawai Islands).

The type locality given is "Sumatra ... [and] island of Banka". Brongersma (1933) emended this to "Deli, Sumatra".

Reproduction
Trimeresurus hageni is oviparous.

References

Further reading
Brongersma LD (1933). "Herpetological Notes I-IX". Zoologische Mededeelingen (Leiden) 16: 1-29. (Trimeresurus hageni, new combination).
Lidth de Jeude, Th. W. van (1886). "On Cophias Wagleri Boie and Coluber sumatranus Raffles". Notes from the Leyden Museum 8 (10): 43–54. ("Bothrops Hageni", new species, pp. 53–54).
Sanders KL, Malhotra A, Thorpe RS (2002). "A contribution to the systematics of two commonly confused pitvipers from the Sunda Region: Trimeresurus hageni and T. sumatranus ". Bull. Nat. Hist. Mus. London (Zool.) 68 (2): 107–111.

External links

Reptiles described in 1886
Reptiles of Southeast Asia
hageni
Reptiles of Borneo